Graham Morgan (born Melbourne, 30 April 1937) is an Australian drummer and teacher of drumming.

He was educated at Melbourne Grammar School. In 1962 he travelled to Los Angeles to study under prominent drummers Joe Morello and Murray Spivack.

His work in television includes playing on the first ABC television broadcast in 1956, and over twenty years as staff drummer at GTV-9, playing in bands on live shows such as The Don Lane Show. He also played for 10 years on programmes on the 0/10 Network, including Young Talent Time and The Ernie Sigley Show.

As well as working with artists Cleo Laine and John Dankworth, John Farnham, Dame Kiri Te Kanawa, Clark Terry, Carmen McRae, Freddie Hubbard, Nancy Wilson, and the Melbourne Symphony Orchestra, he has played with a great many more informal ensembles, and presently plays intermittently with Bete Noire.

He has taught hundreds of students of drumming, at the Victorian College of the Arts, and privately, through Melbourne-based firm Drumtek. His book, Analysis of Contemporary Drumming: A Modern Physical and Conceptual Approach, was published in 1999.

References

Australian drummers
1937 births
Living people